Gyesan Station is a subway station on Line 1 of the Incheon Subway located at Gyesan 1,2 dong, Gyeyang-gu, Incheon. The station is nearby Kyung-in Women's College.

Structure
Gyesan Station is a 2 platform, 2 track underground station. As the ticket gates are separated according to platform, there is no way of crossing over without checking your ticket.

Station layout

Exits

External links

Metro stations in Incheon
Seoul Metropolitan Subway stations
Gyeyang District
Railway stations in South Korea opened in 1999